Sagla Karun Bhagle is a Marathi movie released on 2 December 2011. Produced by Saurabh Kulkarni and directed by Vijay Patkar.

Soundtrack
The music is provided by Nitin Hivarkar.

References

External links 
  IMDB - imdb.com
  Movie Review - movies.burrp.com

2011 films
2010s Marathi-language films